Haksan Park is a park that is located in Dalseo-gu, Daegu, South Korea.
The area of that is 660,000 m2. Another name of Haksan park is Bolli.
The park is equipped with a lot of facilities such as a multipurpose playground, an arboretum, a pond, a path up a mountain, a boardwalk, a parking lot etc.

References
http://100.naver.com/100.nhn?docid=821189

Parks in Daegu
Dalseo District